Radio Pirates, also known as Big Ben Calling, is a 1935 British musical film directed by Ivar Campbell and starring Leslie French, Mary Lawson and Enid Stamp-Taylor. It was made at Shepperton Studios.

Cast
 Leslie French as Leslie  
 Mary Lawson as Mary  
 Warren Jenkins as Billy Brooks  
 Enid Stamp-Taylor 
 Kenneth Kove 
 Edgar Driver 
 Frederick Lloyd 
 John Turnbull 
 Fanny Wright 
 Hughie Green 
 Teddy Brown
 Sally Gray 
 Roy Fox and His Band as themselves

References

Bibliography
Wood, Linda. British Films, 1927–1939. British Film Institute, 1986.

External links

1935 films
1935 musical films
British musical films
Films set in England
Films shot at Shepperton Studios
Films directed by Ivar Campbell
British black-and-white films
1930s English-language films
1930s British films